The 1893 Cirencester by-election was held on 23 February 1893 after a court declared a by-election in 1892 was rerun after the votes had been declared equal.  The seat was gained by the Liberal candidate Harry Lawson Webster Levy-Lawson.  The Conservative candidate Thomas Chester-Master was declared the victor of the 1892 by-election by 3 votes, but on petition and after scrutiny, the votes were declared equal and the 1893 by-election was held.

References 

By-elections to the Parliament of the United Kingdom in Gloucestershire constituencies
February 1893 events
1893 elections in the United Kingdom
1893 in England